Smash Hits is a compilation album by the Jimi Hendrix Experience.  Track Records first issued it on April 12, 1968, in the UK and included all four of the group's singles (both A and B sides) released up to that time, plus four additional songs from the UK edition of Are You Experienced.

Reprise Records did not issue the album in the US until July 30, 1969, with some different tracks.  It included two songs from Electric Ladyland and three tracks from the UK edition of Are You Experienced, which were previously unreleased in the US (including a stereo version of "Red House" from a different take than the original mono album version).

Smash Hits has been reissued several times on CD, however, it has been largely superseded by more recent and comprehensive compilations, such as Experience Hendrix: The Best of Jimi Hendrix (1997).

Critical reception
{{Album reviews
|rev1 = AllMusic
|rev1score = 
|rev2 = Rolling Stone|rev2score = 
}}
In a review for AllMusic, Stephen Thomas Erlewine gave the album four and a half out of five stars. He notes "the main strength of Smash Hits is that it contains the best-known big-name songs in one place. Maybe not enough to make the collection essential, but still enough to make it a representative, accurate sampler".

Robert Christgau included the album in his "Basic Record Library" of 1950s and 1960s recordings, published in Christgau's Record Guide: Rock Albums of the Seventies (1981).

Track listing
The running times are taken from the 1980 Polydor (Europe) and 1979 Reprise (US) reissues; the original Track Records and Reprise Records Smash Hits'' LPs did not include track lengths.  Other releases may show different information. All tracks written by Jimi Hendrix, except where noted.

UK edition

US edition

Charts and certifications

The Recording Industry Association of America (RIAA) certified it as 2× Multi Platinum and the British Phonographic Industry (BPI) ceritifed it as Gold.

Personnel
Jimi Hendrix – vocals, guitar, piano, bass guitar, harpsichord
Mitch Mitchell – drums, backing vocals
Noel Redding – bass guitar, backing vocals

References

1968 greatest hits albums
The Jimi Hendrix Experience albums
Albums produced by Chas Chandler
Albums produced by Jimi Hendrix
Reprise Records compilation albums